Nyholm is a surname. Notable people with the surname include:

Arvid  Nyholm (1866–1927), Swedish-American artist
Bengt Nyholm (1930–2015), Swedish football goalkeeper
Elsa Nyholm (1911–2002), Swedish botanist
Gustaf Nyholm (1880–1957), Swedish chess master
Helinä Häkkänen-Nyholm, finnish psychologist
Jesper Nyholm (born 1993),  Swedish  footballer
Nikolaj Nyholm (born  1975), Danish businesspeople
Robert Nyholm (born 1988), Finnish ice hockey player
Ronald Sydney Nyholm (1917–1971), Australian chemist

See also
Nyholm Naval Base, a former naval base in Copenhagen, Denmark
Nyholm Central Guardhouse, is a historic building at Holmen in Copenhagen, Denmark
Nyholm Prize for Education, Royal Society of Chemistry award

References